Alex Willcock is a British designer and businessman. He is the founder and former CEO of Imagini and founder of Maker and Son. He was married to Sophie Conran, and founded Maker & Son with their son Felix. They also have a daughter, Coco.

Imagini was a London-based software firm founded in 2006. It used images instead of questions to do marketing tasks .One software application matched up a person's choices with that of others in a database, and suggests possible others with similar dispositions and worldviews.

References

Year of birth missing (living people)
Living people
People educated at Eton College
British chief executives
Conran family